High Flyers is a compilation  album by the band Trapeze with the original line up of Galley, Holland, and Hughes.

Track listing

 Send Me No More Letters
 Your Love Is Alright
 Black Cloud
 Medusa
 Coast To Coast
 Will Our Love End
 You Are The Music
 Good Love
 Dat's It
 Send Me No More Letters (US single version)

Personnel
Dave Holland: Drums, percussion (1-10)
Glenn Hughes: Bass guitar, six-string guitar, piano, trombone, lead vocals (1-10)
Mel Galley: Lead & bass guitar, vocals (1-10)
Terry Rowley: Organ, guitar, piano, flute (1,10)
John Jones: Trumpet (1,10)

Additional Musicians
B.J. Cole: Steel guitar (Coast to Coast)
Rod Argent: Electric piano (Coast to Coast)
Frank Ricotti: Vibes (Will our Love End)
Jimmy Hastings: Alto (Will our Love End)

References 

Trapeze (band) albums
1996 greatest hits albums